The Hangu is a left tributary of the river Bistrița in Romania. It flows into Lake Izvorul Muntelui in the proximity of the village Hangu.

References

Rivers of Romania
Rivers of Neamț County